Julieann Louise Krone (born July 24, 1963), is a retired American jockey. In 1993, she became the first (and so far only) female jockey to win a Triple Crown race when she captured the Belmont Stakes aboard Colonial Affair. In 2000, she became the first woman inducted into the National Museum of Racing and Hall of Fame, and in 2003 became the first female jockey to win a Breeders' Cup race.  She has also been honored by induction into the National Women's Hall of Fame and  Cowgirl Hall of Fame.

Riding career
Krone was born in Benton Harbor, Michigan. After spending her childhood as an accomplished show horse rider at competitions in western Michigan, Krone was inspired by the career of Steve Cauthen to become a professional Thoroughbred jockey. She made her debut as a jockey on Jan. 30, 1981, at Tampa Bay Downs in Florida, on a horse named Tiny Star. She won her first race on Feb. 12, 1981, also at Tampa Bay Downs, aboard Lord Farkle. Within a few years, her success made her a well-known racing personality. Krone was the only woman to win riding championships at Belmont Park, Gulfstream Park, Monmouth Park, The Meadowlands and Atlantic City Race Course. She would go on to make appearances on The Late Show with David Letterman, The Tonight Show with Jay Leno, and appear on the cover of Sports Illustrated for the issue of May 22, 1989, one of only eight jockeys so recognized (the others are Willie Shoemaker, Bill Hartack, Eddie Arcaro, Johnny Longden, John Sellers, Robyn Smith and Steve Cauthen). In 1993 she received an ESPY Award as Female Athlete of the Year.

Krone retired for the first time on April 18, 1999, with a three-winner day at Lone Star Park, near Dallas. She embarked upon a broadcasting career in horse racing. From 1999–2000 she worked as an analyst for TVG Network, then worked as a paddock analyst for Hollywood Park from 1999–2002.  She came out of retirement at Santa Anita Park in November 2002. After a good start to the 2003 season, she fractured two bones in her lower back and spent the next four months recovering. She returned to lead the 2003 Del Mar jockeys in purse earnings, then went on to become the first woman jockey to win a Breeders' Cup race when she rode Halfbridled to victory in the 2003 Breeders' Cup Juvenile Fillies at Santa Anita. On December 12, 2003, just weeks after her Breeders' Cup win, she broke several ribs and suffered severe muscle tears in a fall at Hollywood Park Racetrack. Though not fully recovered from her injuries, Krone attempted to come back on February 14, 2004, at Santa Anita Park but failed to win in three races. She did not ride again; on July 8 of that year, she made a statement in which she did not officially retire, but strongly hinted that she would never race again.

Because of her success in the face of severe injuries sustained while racing, Krone was named by USA Today as one of the 10 Toughest Athletes and was honored with the Wilma Rudolph Courage Award by the Women's Sports Foundation. Krone also had been inducted into the Cowgirl Hall of Fame in Fort Worth, Texas, and is a member of the Michigan Sports Hall of Fame. In October 2013 she was inducted into the National Women's Hall of Fame in Seneca Falls, N.Y. In 2018 a bronze statue of her was given to the National Museum of Racing and Hall of Fame.

Personal life

In 2001 Krone married Jay Hovdey, executive columnist for the Daily Racing Form. She gave birth to their daughter Lorelei Judith Krone in 2005. (Hovdey also has a son, Ed, from his previous marriage.) Her mother, Judi Krone, was an accomplished equestrian who died a few days before Christmas of 1999.

Since her second retirement from racing, Krone has focused on parenting and worked as a racing broadcaster, motivational speaker, and an instructor of natural horsemanship. Krone rode in one sanctioned betting race at Santa Anita Park on October 18, 2008, competing against seven other retired Hall of Fame jockeys: Gary Stevens, Pat Day, Chris McCarron, Jerry Bailey, Ángel Cordero, Jacinto Vásquez and Sandy Hawley. Krone also rode to victory on Invincible Hero in the Leger Legends for famous retired European jockeys at the St Leger Festival, Doncaster Racecourse (UK), on 7 September 2011.

References

General
Miller, Mark. Julie Krone, Salon,  December 19, 2000
 Julie Krone at the United States' National Museum of Racing and Hall of Fame
 Callahan, Dorothy M. ''Julie Krone: A Winning Jockey (1990) Dillon Press 

Specific

1963 births
Living people
American jockeys
American female jockeys
People from Benton Harbor, Michigan
United States Thoroughbred Racing Hall of Fame inductees
American horse racing announcers
Women sports announcers
Cowgirl Hall of Fame inductees
21st-century American women